Manon Souyris (born 30 June 1993) is a French professional racing cyclist, who currently rides for UCI Women's Continental Team . In October 2020, she rode in the women's edition of the 2020 Liège–Bastogne–Liège race in Belgium.

Major results

2011
 4th Road race, UCI Junior Road World Championships
2013
 9th Cholet Pays de Loire Dames
2014
 5th Grand Prix de Plumelec-Morbihan Dames
2015
 6th Grand Prix de Plumelec-Morbihan Dames
2018
 6th Kreiz Breizh Elites Dames
2019
 7th La Périgord Ladies
 9th SwissEver GP Cham-Hagendorn
2022
 3rd Grand Prix Velo Alanya

References

External links
 

1993 births
Living people
French female cyclists
Sportspeople from Albi
Cyclists from Occitania (administrative region)